Norton Township is one of seventeen townships in Kankakee County, Illinois, USA. As of the 2010 census, its population was 978 and it contained 400 housing units. Norton Township was organized in 1857 out of Essex Township.

Geography

Cities, towns, villages
 Buckingham
 Cabery (north half)
 Reddick (southeast three-quarters)
 Union Hill

Adjacent townships
 Essex Township (north)
 Pilot Township (east)
 Milks Grove Township, Iroquois County (southeast)
 Rogers Township, Ford County (south)
 Broughton Township, Livingston County (southwest)
 Round Grove Township, Livingston County (west)
 Greenfield Township, Grundy County (northwest)

Cemeteries
The township contains these five cemeteries: Coleman, Edgerville, Floridgeville, Mount Hope and Smith.

Major highways
  Illinois Route 17
  Illinois Route 115

Airports and landing strips
 Hendrix Airport
 Hugh Van Voorst Airport

Demographics

Government
The township is governed by an elected Town Board of a Supervisor and four Trustees.  The Township also has an elected Assessor, Clerk, Highway Commissioner and Supervisor.  The Township Office is located at 16930 West 6000 South Road, Buckingham, IL 60917.

Political districts
 Illinois's 11th congressional district
 State House District 75
 State Senate District 38

School districts
 Herscher Community Unit School District 2
 Tri Point Community Unit School District 6-J

References
 
 United States Census Bureau 2007 TIGER/Line Shapefiles
 United States National Atlas

External links
 Kankankee County Official Site
 City-Data.com
 Illinois State Archives

Townships in Kankakee County, Illinois
Populated places established in 1857
Townships in Illinois
1857 establishments in Illinois